Beaufoy is a surname. Notable people with the surname include:

Henry Beaufoy (1750–1795), British politician
Mark Beaufoy (1764–1827), English astronomer, physicist, mountaineer, explorer, and British Army officer
Mark Hanbury Beaufoy (1854–1922), British vinegar manufacturer and politician
Simon Beaufoy (born 1966), British screenwriter